This is a list of pre-World War II television stations of the 1920s and 1930s. Most of these experimental stations were located in Europe (notably in the United Kingdom, France, Germany, Italy, Poland, the Netherlands, and Russia), Australia, Canada, and the United States. Some present-day broadcasters trace their origins to these early stations.

All television licenses in the United States were officially "experimental" before July 1941, as the NTSC television standard had yet to be developed, and some American television broadcasters continued operating under experimental licenses as late as 1947, although by then they were using the same technical standards as their commercial brethren.

List

 Present North American broadcast television starts at 54 MHz (VHF)
 Present day UK TV broadcasts begin at 470 MHz (UHF)

See also 
 Timeline of the BBC
 History of television
 Timeline of the introduction of television in countries
 Timeline of the introduction of color television in countries
 Geographical usage of television
 Moving image formats
 Oldest radio station
 List of experimental television stations
 Narrow-bandwidth television
 Television systems before 1940

Individual television stations 
 WRGB
 WNBC
 WCBS-TV
 KCBS-TV
 BBC / BBC Television

Broadcast television systems 
 Television systems before 1940
 NTSC
 PAL
 SECAM

References

External links 
  Prewar US Stations
 1936 German Olympics
 W1XAY at TVHistory.tv
 European Television Stations in 1932

Television stations
History of television
Television pioneers
Timelines of mass media